A bookworm or bibliophile is an avid reader and lover of books.

Bookworm may also refer to:

Arts, entertainment, and media
 Bookworm (comics), a comic strip in the Whoopee! and Whizzer and Chips comic books
 The Bookworm (painting), a 1850 painting by German painter Carl Spitzweg
 "The Bookworm" (short story), a short story by Pu Songling
 Bookworm (Tiny Toon Adventures), a character on the cartoon Tiny Toon Adventures
 Bookworm (video game), a 2003 word-forming puzzle video game by PopCap Games
Bookworm Adventures, a 2006 follow-up game
 Bookworm, an American radio show on literature hosted by Michael Silverblatt
 The Bookworm (1994–2000), a BBC television programme on literature hosted by Griff Rhys Jones
 The Bookworm, a villain in the 1960s Batman TV show
 The Bookworm, a 1939 Metro-Goldwyn-Mayer animated short
 Bookworm, a screenplay by David Mamet that became the 1997 movie The Edge
 "Bookworm, Run!", a 1996 science fiction short story by Vernor Vinge

Other uses
 Bookworm (insect), a popular generalization for any insect which supposedly bores through books
 The Bookworm (bookstore), an independent bookstore in Beijing, China
 Bookworm, the codename of version 12 of the Debian Linux operating system